Purdum is a surname. Notable people with the surname include:

Tanner Purdum (born 1984), American football player
Todd S. Purdum (born 1959), American journalist

See also
Purdum, Nebraska